Mostafalu (also Romanized as Moşţafálū) is a village in Khandan Rural District, Tarom Sofla District, Qazvin County, Qazvin Province, Iran. At the 2006 census, its population was 112, in 30 families.

References 

Populated places in Qazvin County